Boris Lilov (24 May 1923 – May 1969) was a Soviet equestrian. He competed at the 1952 Summer Olympics and the 1956 Summer Olympics.

References

External links
 

1923 births
1969 deaths
People from Klinsky Uyezd
Russian male equestrians
Soviet male equestrians
Olympic equestrians of the Soviet Union
Equestrians at the 1952 Summer Olympics
Equestrians at the 1956 Summer Olympics